Mirosław Piękoś (born May 18, 1963) is a Polish former footballer who played as a midfielder.

Career 
Piękoś played in the Ekstraklasa with Stal Mielec during the 1986–87 season. In 1988, he played abroad in the Canadian Soccer League with North York Rockets. The following season he signed with league rivals Ottawa Intrepid. After a season with Ottawa, he was transferred to Kitchener Spirit for the 1990 season. In 1991, he was traded to his former club North York Rockets for future considerations. 

In July 1991, he was placed on waivers with Hamilton Steelers signing him, and appeared in four matches. In 1993, he played in the Canadian National Soccer League with Richmond Hill Kick.

References  
 

Living people
1963 births
Association football midfielders
Polish footballers
Polish expatriate footballers
People from Mielec
Sportspeople from Podkarpackie Voivodeship
Stal Mielec players
North York Rockets players
Ottawa Intrepid players
Kitchener Spirit players
Hamilton Steelers (1981–1992) players
Ekstraklasa players
Canadian Soccer League (1987–1992) players
Canadian National Soccer League players
Polish expatriate sportspeople in Canada
Expatriate soccer players in Canada